Astrobiology is a peer-reviewed scientific journal covering research on the origin, evolution, distribution and future of life across the universe. The journal's scope includes astrobiology, astrophysics, astropaleontology, bioastronomy, cosmochemistry, ecogenomics, exobiology, extremophiles, geomicrobiology, gravitational biology, life detection technology, meteoritics, origins of life, planetary geoscience, planetary protection, prebiotic chemistry, space exploration technology and terraforming.

Abstracting and indexing
This journal is indexed by the following services:  

According to the Journal Citation Reports, the journal has a 2019 impact factor of 4.091.

References

External links 
 

Astrobiology journals
Mary Ann Liebert academic journals
Publications established in 2001
Bimonthly journals
English-language journals